In My Life is a 2009 Philippine drama film released by Star Cinema, starring Vilma Santos-Recto, Luis Manzano and John Lloyd Cruz.  The film was directed by Olivia Lamasan, and filmed mainly in New York City.

Plot
Shirley Templo (Vilma Santos-Recto) is a ruthless woman.  Many people deal with her strong attitude only for fear of her cold stare, or her outlash.  She works as a librarian in a school, and lives in a compound that is owned by her ex-husband, Benito Salvacion (Tirso Cruz III).  Many of the Salvacion family members that live near the compound, even including her eldest daughter, Dang (Dimples Romana), plead with her to sell it so they can make a profit, and she can move to a more suitable living area.  Hard-headed as she is, Shirley refuses and feels betrayed by her two daughters, Dang and Cherry, for even siding with their father who left them nearly fifteen years ago.  Even more upset, she finds out that Dang will want to move out of the Philippines to Australia.  Leaving her alone in the Philippines since all her children moved out, Shirley decides to move to New York City with her youngest and only son, Mark Salvacion (Luis Manzano).  Mark is unaware, however, that this supposed vacation of his mother is actually a permanent visit.

Upon her arrival to the States, Shirley is picked up at the airport by Noel Villanueva (John Lloyd Cruz).  Thinking he was only hired help, she rudely offers him payment for his services, but he declines.  As she walks around the apartment, she notices pictures of Mark and Noel being affectionate toward each other.  She then realizes that Noel is, in fact, Mark's new boyfriend.  Although she was aware of Mark's homosexuality since his high school years, she gives Noel plenty of trouble and hard times.  The story reflects how Shirley changes her attitudes and views from two men that become a big part of her life, and how she accepts the reality that has been presented to her.  Unfortunately, unforeseen tragedies occur, and a rift between Shirley and Noel arise.  But as she understands Mark's reasons for having her be around Noel all this time, she resolves her issues with him and soon embraces him as a member of her family.

Cast

Main Cast
 Vilma Santos-Recto as Shirley Templo
 Luis Manzano as Mark Salvacion, Shirley's son.
 John Lloyd Cruz as Noel Villanueva, Mark's lover.

Supporting Cast
 Vice Ganda as Hillary
 Nikki Valdez as Mia
 Dimples Romana as Dang Salvacion
 Rafael Rosell as Vince
 Tirso Cruz III as Benito Salvacion
 Paw Diaz as Cherry Salvacion
 Nonie Buencamino as Noel's father
 Shamaine Buencamino as Noels's mother
 Arnold Reyes as Albert

Production
Initially, Manzano turned down the role of Mark Salvacion, and admitted he was uncomfortable with the intimate scenes between the two male characters. He accepted the role after reading the script and understanding the character. His mother and co-star Vilma Santos meanwhile made it clear that she did not influence Manzano's decision.

John Lloyd Cruz stated that he had no problem with the gay scenes, saying that he would do it as an actor.

Reception
In My Life was generally well received by critics and at the box office. Many people praised the storyline, meaning, and acting of Vilma Santos, John Lloyd Cruz, and Luis Manzano.

The film garnered an unexpected ₱20,000,000 on its first day of release, and nearly ₱80,000,000 on its opening weekend.

By the end of 2009, In My Life placed second on the Top 13 local 2009 Philippine movies list just behind You Changed My Life, which also starred Cruz. In My Life would have broken Philippine movie records if not for Typhoon Ondoy.

The film had its television premiere on ABS-CBN on Christmas Day 2010.

Awards
8th Gawad Tanglaw awards (March 3, 2010)
Best Film
Best Actor - John Lloyd Cruz 
Best Supporting Actor - Luis Manzano 
Best Director - Olivia Lamasan

Gawad Suri Awards (March 2010)
Best Film
Best Director - Olivia Lamasan
Best Actress - Vilma Santos
Best Actor - John Lloyd Cruz
Best Supporting Actor - Luis Manzano

26th PMPC Star Awards for Movies (April 24, 2010)
Best Picture
Best Director - Olivia Lamasan
Best Actress - Vilma Santos
Best Actor - John Lloyd Cruz
Best Supporting Actor - Luis Manzano
Best Screenplay
Best Cinematography

41st GMMSF Box-office Entertainment Awards (June 22, 2010)
Best Actress - Vilma Santos
Best Actors - John Lloyd Cruz and Luis Manzano 
Best Screenplay - Raymond Lee, Senedy Que, and Olivia Lamasan

1st MTRCB Film Awards (June 25, 2010)
Best Actress -Vilma Santos 
Best supporting actor - John Lloyd Cruz

4th Genio Awards (January 2, 2011)
Best Actress - Vilma Santos
Best Actor - John Lloyd Cruz
Best Supporting Actor - Luis Manzano
Best Screenplay

References

External links

2009 films
2009 comedy-drama films
Filipino-language films
Philippine LGBT-related films
Star Cinema films
Films shot in New York City
Films directed by Olivia Lamasan
Films set in New York City
Philippine comedy-drama films
2009 LGBT-related films
LGBT-related comedy-drama films